SH3 Domain Binding Kinase Family Member 3 is an enzyme that in humans is encoded by the SBK3 gene (also known as SGK110). SBK3 is a member of the serine/threonine protein kinase family. The SBK3 protein is known to exhibit transferase activity, especially phosphotransferase activity, and tyrosine kinase activity.  It is well-conserved throughout mammalian organisms and has two paralogs: SBK1 and SBK2.

Gene 
SBK3 is found on the minus strand of chromosome 19 in humans: 19q13.42. Its reference isoform consists of 4,985 bases. Nearby genes include SBK2, a paralog to SBK3, as well as SSC5D, ZNF579, and FIZ1.

Transcripts 
SBK3 has five exons; however, only four are included in the final mRNA transcript. SBK3 is found to have one isoform outside of its typical transcript. The reference isoform does not include exon 2 and isoform X1 does not include exon 1.

Protein

General properties 
SBK3's reference protein has a predicted molecular mass of 38.5 kDa and isoelectric point of 4.71 pI. SBK3 has a significantly higher presence of proline amino acids than most proteins, which aligns with its proline-rich compositional bias that spans residues 189-278. The exact function of this proline-rich region in SBK3 is yet to be determined; however, prior research states that it's the region in which the SH3 domain of interacting proteins binds to SBK3.

Primary sequence 
As previously stated, SBK3's reference protein is made up of 359 amino acids. The polypeptide chain that results from the translation of SBK3 into the SBK3 protein is shown below. A non-canonical polyadenylation signal ‘TATAAA’ is found 622 bases downstream from the stop codon.

Domains 
SBK3 has a large conserved catalytic domain specific to the protein kinase superfamily. Nineteen ATP-binding sites found in SBK3’s paralog, SBK1, are all conserved in SBK3. The tyrosine motif exists in SBK3 (residues 44-233) and is found to overlap the conserved protein kinase superfamily domain (residues 49-208). SBK3's active site (ACT) is predicted to span residues 159-171. A cross-program analysis revealed a predicted transmembrane domain (TMD) approximately spanning residues 224-240. A SUMO-interacting motif (SIM) is predicted to span residues 298-302.

Secondary structure 

A cross-program analysis predicted SBK3's secondary structure to consist of eight alpha helices and two beta sheets.

Tertiary structure 
SBK3's predicted tertiary structure is shown to have many alpha-helices and few beta-sheets, thereby aligning with previous secondary structure predictions. Homologous proteins were analyzed to identify structural similarities. According to PHYRE2, SBK3's sequence is similar to that of the F chain of the α subunit of IκB kinase (73% query cover, 24% identical) which is involved in the upstream NF-κB signal transduction cascade. According to SWISS-MODEL, SBK3's sequence is 30% similar to mitogen-activated protein kinase 8 (MAPK8).

Ligand binding 
The 1JC ligand is predicted to interact with the SBK3 protein (97% confidence). This ligand is functionally annotated to bind to a receptor tyrosine kinase called the hepatocyte growth factor receptor.

Regulation

Gene level regulation

Enhancer initiated transcription 
The location of SBK3's promoter and associated enhancer align with the concept of enhancer initiated transcription because their sequences, as found on chromosome 19, overlap. Recent studies have shown that enhancers can sometimes initiate transcription; however, the functional role of transcription initiation by enhancers is not yet defined.

Tissue expression 
Overall, SBK3 has low expression as it is expressed at only 4.6% of the average human gene. SBK3's highest levels of expression are in human cardiac muscle tissue, but it is also found to be expressed in skeletal muscle tissue. During human fetal development, expression is the highest within the lung at 17 weeks. In mice, SBK3 is annotated as having biased expression primarily in adult heart tissue, which is followed by adult lung tissue. However, in the mouse embryo, there is no evidence of biased expression. In pig brains, the retina was shown to have the highest level of SBK3 expression.

Conditional expression 
A novel conditional nebulin knockout mouse model revealed an increase in SBK3 expression in the quadriceps and soleus muscles. The mice in this study were born with high nebulin levels in their skeletal muscle but nebulin expression rapidly fell within weeks after birth. This study observed that knockout mice that survived to adulthood experienced fiber-type switching towards oxidative types. Consequently, SBK3 expression was found to increase in the quadriceps and soleus muscles of nebulin conditional knockout mice.

Transcript level regulation

miRNA targeting 
In its 3'UTR, SBK3 is predicted to be targeted by four miRNAs: hsa-miR-637, hsa-miR-6077, hsa-miR-6760-5p, and hsa-miR-1291. All four miRNAs are conserved throughout primates and are identified to bind to stem-loop structures found within the 3' UTR.

Protein level regulation

Post-translational modifications 

SBK3 has 29 proposed phosphorylation sites at various serine, threonine, and tyrosine residues. O-GlcNAc is predicted to occur at five threonines and one serine. SUMOylation was predicted to occur at two lysine residues: K165 and K347; a SUMO-interacting motif was found between residues 298-302. SBK3 is also predicted undergo C-mannosylation at a singular tryptophan residue: W258.

Subcellular localization 
Through the use of antibodies, SBK3 has been observed to localize to the mitochondria. PSORT's k-NN prediction determined that SBK3 was 39.1% likely to localize to the mitochondria and 21.7% likely to localize to the cytoplasm. The Reinhardt method predicted SBK3's localization to by cytoplasmic with a reliability score of 89. No signal peptide has been found in SBK3. Further analysis of SBK3's behavior in the cell is required to fully understand its subcellular localization.

Homology/evolution

Paralogs 
As previously stated, SBK3 has two paralogs: SBK1 and SBK2.

Orthologs 
A total of 141 organisms are found to have orthologs with the SBK3 gene, all of which are jawed vertebrates. Of these 141 orthologs, 121 of them are mammals. SBK3 is not found in amphibians.

Phylogeny 
SBK3 diverged from cartilaginous fishes around 400 years ago, birds and reptiles around 300 million years ago, non-primate mammals around 90 million years ago. Divergence from primates last occurred around nine million years ago.

Function 
SBK3 is statistically predicted to be involved in sarcomere organization, regulation of muscle relaxation, cardiac myofibril assembly, and regulation of cardiac muscle contraction by regulation of the release of sequestered calcium ions. However, the function of SBK3 has yet to be well understood by the scientific community.

Interacting proteins

Transcription factor binding sites 
SBK3's promoter region was analyzed to identify predicted transcription factor binding sites (TFBS) that had high matrix similarity scores, close proximity to the transcription start site (TSS), high conservation throughout primates, and/or are a TATA-binding protein (TBP). Conserved matrix families of interest include KLFS and mammalian transcriptional repressor (RBPF) as they both pertain to cardiac differentiation and function.

Protein-protein interactions 
According to STRING, SBK3 interacts with FAM86B1, TBCK, POMK, DNPEP, TEX14, PKDCC, and TM6SF1. Many of these proteins are associated with a form of kinase activity. According to Mentha, SBK3 interacts with SMAD3, MBD3L2, Q494R0, SNRNP35, A8MTQ0, AIMP2, DMAP1, EXOSC2, TNNT1, GATAD2B, and Q8WUT1. SMAD3 is a receptor-regulated subtype of SMAD, which is shown to have a highly conserved TFBS in SBK3 with a high matrix similarity score.

Clinical significance 
SBK3 has been shown to be enriched in hemostasis and signal transduction pathways. Additionally, a GWAS study highlighted a significant association between SBK3 and unspecified psychiatric, cognitive, and behavioral traits. In lupus kidney biopsies, SBK3 was shown to have a negative correlation with the expression of CD3 and CD4 T-cell receptors. In a study comparing primary tumors and metastatic tumors from the kidney, this gene was found to have at least a two-fold increase in expression in metastasic tumors. A pharmacological profiling study identified SBK3 as an inhibitor of fostamanib, an orphan drug for rheumatoid arthritis and immune thrombocytopenic purpura.

References 

Enzymes
Genetics